Lucelle Frances Beetham (née Swainson; 24 March 1842 – 11 October 1910) was a New Zealand artist and natural history illustrator.

Personal life
Lucelle Frances Swainson was born on 24 March 1842, the second daughter of the naturalist William John Swainson and Anne Grasby. She grew up in the Hutt Valley; on 17 September 1863 she married magistrate and artist Richmond Beetham, moving with him to Queenstown in the 1870s. She died in 1910, aged 68.

Artwork
Beetham took after her artist father and was a talented illustrator, producing several botanical and bird studies. Some of her works are now held in the Alexander Turnbull Library in Wellington.

References

1842 births
1910 deaths
New Zealand women artists
People from Wellington City